The Aero East Europe Sila (English: force, power or strength and also short for Serbian industry light aircraft) is a family of Serbian ultralight and light aircraft, designed and produced by Aero East Europe of Kraljevo and later of Jagodina, introduced at the AERO Friedrichshafen show in 2013. The design is supplied complete and ready-to-fly.

Design and development
The Sila 450 C was designed to comply with the Fédération Aéronautique Internationale microlight rules, while the larger aircraft in the family fit into the EASA CS-VLA category. All feature a V-strut-braced high-wing, an enclosed cabin, fixed tricycle landing gear and a single engine in tractor configuration.

Operational history
Reviewer Marino Boric described the design in a 2015 review as "very robust".

Variants
Sila 450 C
Standard engines available are the  Rotax 912UL,  Rotax 912ULS and the  Rotax 914 four-stroke powerplants. German LTF-UL and Serbian ultralight certified.
Sila 750 C
Standard engines available are the  Rotax 912ULS, the  Rotax 914 and the  Lycoming O-320 four-stroke powerplants. The aircraft is undergoing EASA CS-VLA and Serbian certification.
Sila 750 S
Sila 750 MT
Standard engines available are the  Rotax 912ULS, the  Rotax 914 and the  Lycoming O-320 four-stroke powerplants. The aircraft is undergoing EASA VLA and Serbian certification.
Sila 950
Standard engines available are the  Rotax 914 and the  Lycoming O-320 four-stroke powerplants. The aircraft is no longer advertised on the company website.

Specifications (Sila 450 C)

References

External links

Aero East Europe aircraft
2010s Serbian ultralight aircraft
Single-engined tractor aircraft
High-wing aircraft